Lubombo is a region of Eswatini, located in the east of the country. It has an area of 5,849.11 km² and a population of 212,531 (2017). Its administrative center is Siteki.  It borders all three other regions: Hhohho to the north, Manzini to the west, and Shiselweni to the south. It is divided into 11 tinkhundla.

Geography 
Geographically, the region is dominated almost entirely by the Lubombo Mountains.
The Lubombo District is the easternmost of the four regions of Eswatini. Its capital is Siteki.

Administrative divisions
Lubombo is subdivided to 11 tinkhundla (or constituencies). These are local administration centres, and also parliamentary constituencies. Each inkhundla is headed by an indvuna yenkhundla or governor with the help of bucopho. The tinkhundla are further divided into imiphakatsi (or chiefdoms). The present tinkhundla are:

 Dvokodvweni
 Imiphakatsi: Enjabulweni, Etjedze, Malindza, Mampempeni, Mdumezulu, Mhlangatane, Sigcaweni
 Hlane
 Imiphakatsi: Hlane, Khuphuka, Ntandweni, Sikhuphe
 Lomahasha
 Imiphakatsi: Lomahasha, Mafucula, Shewula, Tsambokhulu
 Lubuli (Somntongo)
 Imiphakatsi: Canerbury, Kavuma, Mabantaneni, Nkhanini, Sifuntaneni
 Lugongolweni
 Imiphakatsi: Langa, Makhewu, Mlindazwe, Sitsatsaweni
 Matsanjeni North
 Imiphakatsi: Lukhetseni, Mambane, Maphungwane, Tikhuba
 Mhlume
 Imiphakatsi: Mhlume, Simunye, Tabankulu, Tshaneni, Vuvulane
 Mpholonjeni
 Imiphakatsi: Kashoba, Ndzangu, Ngcina
 Nkilongo
 Imiphakatsi: Crooks, Gamula, Lunkufu, Mayaluka, Ngcampalala
 Siphofaneni
 Imiphakatsi: Hlutse, Kamkhweli, Macetjeni, Madlenya, Maphilingo, Mphumakudze, Nceka, Ngevini, Tambuti
 Sithobela
 Imiphakatsi: Luhlanyeni, Mamiza, Nkonjwa

References

 
Regions of Eswatini